Gagel is a German habitational surname for a person from Gagel in the Altmark region of northern Saxony-Anhalt and may refer to:
Alexander Gagel (1933–2019), German judge
Curt Gagel (1865–1927), German geologist
Oskar Gagel (1899–1978), German neurologist
Wally Gagel, American record producer, songwriter, engineer and musician
Walter Gagel (1926–2016), German social scientist

References 

German-language surnames